Devil's Slide is a geological formation located near the border of Wyoming in northern Utah's Weber Canyon, near the community of Croydon in Morgan County, Utah, United States. The Slide consists of two parallel limestone strata that have been tilted to lie vertical, protruding  out of the mountainside. The distance between the two slabs is around 7.6 m. 

I-84 runs right past Devil's Slide, which can be clearly seen from the road. The Weber River flows between the formation and the freeway. There are parking areas on both sides of the highway for viewing the Slide.

Background 
Devil's Slide was originally discovered by Utah settlers in the 1840s in upper Weber Canyon. Early settlers, including a well known railman by the name of John Walker, called the side "Gutter Defile" on their maps. The settlers were working with the Transcontinental Railroad to establish tracks through the Weber Canyon, Utah area.

There are four other geological formations in the United States called "Devil's Slide," including California and Montana, just north of Yellowstone in addition to the one in Utah. Utah Geologist believe the Slide was formed 170 to 180 million years ago by a draining sea that poured down the center of the Slide. The first mentioning of Devil's Slide by its current name was in 1875.

The Salt Lake Tribune printed a story on the workcamp turned small town near the Slide on June 28, 1888, authored by Allan Forman. The town had sprung up due to the abundant limestone available in the area. The Native American tour guide the newspaper had hired called the formation, "Devil's War Club." The mining town was originally called Portland, but would be renamed Devil's Slide in honor of the proximity to the Slide nearby. Before the Great Depression, Devil's Slide had 500 residents, but would slowly close down until only a school and small group of families remained. The town would eventually be closed after the mining company shut down operations. A large gravel pit is the only evidence the town existed that remains to this day.

Legends of the Slide 
Local legend about the Slide states that when God threw Lucifer out of heaven after he betrayed him, before the start of mankind, he slid down the mountainside to hell along the route of Devil's Slide.

Another legend states that Father Pietro del Torra, a Christian Missionary traveling through the canyon encountered the Devil, disguised as a Spaniard. The Father was tempted of the Devil with food, spirits, wealth, and other fine material things. When the Priest resisted, the Devil threatened to kill him. The Father held up a crucifix and prayed, which weakened the Devil, causing him to fall down the side of the mountain, thus forming Devil's Slide, the Devil's Club, or the Devil's Gate, another term by which the Slide was previously known.

Gallery

References

External links

 

Geology of Utah
Landforms of Morgan County, Utah
Rock formations of Utah
Tourist attractions in Morgan County, Utah